Sunside Acquisitions Limited is a special purpose vehicle set up by Heineken to house its Southern and Eastern African assets alongside the bulk of the Distell business.

History 
On 15 November 2021, Heineken announced a plan to acquire part of Distell Group business, in order to become the market-leading alcoholic beverage supplier in South Africa. Through the deal, Heineken and Remgro aimed to spin-off a bulk of Distell's business to Sunside Acquisitions Ltd. As part of the transaction, Heineken agreed to merge its investments in Heineken South Africa, Namibia Breweries and operations in Kenya, Uganda, Tanzania, Zambia, Botswana, Zimbabwe and South Sudan into the new entity.

See also 

 Kenya Wine Agencies Limited
 Namibia Breweries Limited
 Remgro

References 

Companies established in 2021
South African companies established in 2021
Food and drink companies established in 2021
South African brands
Beer in Africa
Breweries of Africa
Multinational breweries
Heineken